Eckener Point is a point marking both the northeast side of the entrance to Charlotte Bay and the west side of the entrance to Latinka Cove, and forming the western extremity of Pefaur (Ventimiglia) Peninsula on the west coast of Graham Land. It was first roughly charted by the Belgian Antarctic Expedition under Gerlache, 1897–99. It was named by the UK Antarctic Place-Names Committee in 1960 for Hugo Eckener, a German pioneer of airship aviation who was president of Aeroarctic, an international society for exploration of the Arctic with airships, 1929–37. He piloted the Graf Zeppelin for more than 600 flights including a major Arctic flight in 1931.

Map
 British Antarctic Territory.  Scale 1:200000 topographic map. DOS 610 Series, Sheet W 64 60.  Directorate of Overseas Surveys, Tolworth, UK, 1978.

External links
 Eckener Point. Copernix satellite image

References 

 SCAR Composite Gazetteer of Antarctica.

Headlands of Graham Land
Danco Coast